Vikingen Island is a small island  in the southern part of Rødøy municipality  in Nordland, Norway. The island is notable for having the Arctic Circle pass through it, something that is marked by a small statue with a globe. It is possible to view the midnight sun from Vikingen Island.

References

Geography of the Arctic
Islands of Nordland
Rødøy